Robert Lyman Starkey (September 27, 1899, Fitchburg, Massachusetts – August 8, 1991, Jamesburg, New Jersey) was an American microbiologist. He was the president of the American Society for Microbiology in 1963.

Biography
Starkey graduated in 1921 with a B.S. from Massachusetts Agricultural College (now named the University of Massachusetts Amherst). At Rutgers University, he graduated in 1923 with an M.S. and in 1924 with a Ph.D. in microbiology. During his graduate school years, he worked from 1922 to 1924 as an assistant at the New Jersey Agricultural Experiment Station. From 1924 to 1926 he was an instructor in bacteriology at the University of Minnesota. In the department of microbiology of Rutgers University, he was an assistant professor from 1926 to 1934, an associate professor from 1934 to 1944, and a full professor from 1944 to 1965, when he retired as professor emeritus. From 1954 to 1965 he was the head of the department of agricultural microbiology. At the New Jersey Agricultural Experiment Station, he was an associate soil microbiologist from 1926 to 1944 and a research specialist from 1944 to 1965. For the academic year 1937–1938 he was a Rockefeller Foundation fellow at the Delft University of Technology.

He did research on bacterial decomposition of organic matter, nitrogen fixation, the role of sulfur, iron, carbon, nitrogen, and other elements in agricultural bacteriology, and industrial fermentation. For a number of years, he was Selman Waksman's deputy at the New Jersey Agricultural Experiment Station.

Starkey was elected in 1930 a Fellow of the American Association for the Advancement of Science. From 1941 to 1942 he was the first president of the Theobald Smith Society (the New Jersey branch of the American Society for Microbiology). In 1976 he received the Charles Thom Award from the Society for Industrial Microbiology and Biotechnology.

In 1928 he married Florence G. Tenney (1901–1997). In 1928 she received her Ph.D. in microbiology from Rutgers. In the later part of her career, she worked as a researcher on antibiotics at E. R. Squibb & Sons. She coauthored several papers with Selman Waksman.

Selected publications

Articles
 
  abstract
  abstract
 
  abstract

Books

References

1899 births
1991 deaths
American microbiologists
University of Massachusetts Amherst alumni
Rutgers University alumni
Rutgers University faculty
Fellows of the American Association for the Advancement of Science
People from Fitchburg, Massachusetts